Fight Network Radio may refer to: 

Live Audio Wrestling#Fight Network Radio, a network of conventional radio stations
Fight Network Radio (Sirius radio show)